Kottakamboor  is a village in Devikulam taluk of Idukki district in the state of Kerala, India.

Demographics
As of 2011 Census, Kottakamboor had a population of 2,405 people where 1,249 are males and 1,156 are females. In Kottakamboor, 11.68% of the population was under 6 years of age. Kottakamboor had an average literacy of 61.6% lower than the national average of 74% and state average of 94%.

References

Villages in Idukki district